Ravan Press, established in 1972 by Peter Ralph Randall, Danie van Zyl, and Beyers Naudé, was a South African anti-apartheid publishing house. 

Ravan Press was initially established to print the reports of the South African Study Project of Christianity in Apartheid Society (Spro-Cas). In 1974 it became a donor-funded oppositional publishing house, specializing in anti-apartheid literature.

In 1984, following its release of Njabulo Ndebele's novel Fools and Other Stories (Staffrider Series, No. 19), Ravan Press won the Noma Award for Publishing in Africa.

In the 1990s Ravan Press was taken over by Pan MacMillan.

Book series published by Ravan Press
 Battles of the Anglo-Boers
 New History of Southern Africa
 Ravan Local History
 Ravan Playscripts
 Ravan Writers Series
 Staffrider Series
 Topic Series

References

Further reading
 G. E. De Villiers, Ravan: Twenty-Five Years (1972-1997): A Commemorative Volume of New Writing, Randburg, South Africa: Ravan Press, 1997.

External links
 Josh MacPhee, Judging Books by Their Covers 239: Ravan Books, Just Seeds, June 27, 2016.

Publishing companies established in 1972
Book publishing companies of South Africa
Anti-Apartheid organisations
South African companies established in 1972